The 1952 Polish Speedway season was the 1952 season of motorcycle speedway in Poland.

Individual

Polish Individual Speedway Championship
The 1952 Individual Speedway Polish Championship was held in Wrocław on 17 August 1952.

Team

Team Speedway Polish Championship
The 1952 Team Speedway Polish Championship was the fifth edition of the Team Polish Championship.

Rules
In First League, matches were played with part two teams, without it playing it matches return.  Teams consisted of 6 drivers plus 2 reserves. The score of heat: 3–2–1–0. Mecz consisted with 9 heats. For winning game team received 2 points, lost – 0 points. The drivers from the main squad started in a match three times. The quantity of small points was added up.

Before the season it was established that only 4 full rounds would take place with the 5th round consisting of only the first 8 teams. After playing 5 rounds the first 4  teams played a "Play-Off" (Semi-Final and Final).

Ogniwo Bytom was moved to Łódź, and CWKS from Warszawa to Wrocław.

First League 

Play-Offs

Medalists

References

Poland Individual
Poland Team
Speedway